Ricardo Rayas Sánchez (born 7 February 1970 in León), is a Mexican footballer and manager, recently was the head coach of Leones Negros UdeG in Ascenso MX.

References

External links

1970 births
Living people
Footballers from Guanajuato
Mexican footballers
Sportspeople from León, Guanajuato
Club León footballers
C.D. Veracruz footballers
Mexican football managers
Toros Neza footballers
Irapuato F.C. managers
Mineros de Zacatecas managers
Association footballers not categorized by position